Philip de Lange (c. 1705 – 17 September 1766) was a leading Dutch-Danish architect who designed many different types of building in various styles including Dutch Baroque and Rococo.

Early life and family

Philip de Lange was probably born near Strasbourg and was trained as a mason in the Netherlands. He arrived in Copenhagen, Denmark, in 1729 where he quickly gained a reputation as an architect and master builder.

Achievements

De Lange created a large number of works of various types including civil and military buildings, mansions, country houses, warehouses, factories, churches and parks.

The Dutch Baroque influence in his early work can, for example, be seen in the premises he built for Ziegler, the pastry cook, at Nybrogade 12 (1732). While initially he appears to have been struck by Ewert Janssen's earlier work, he soon seems to have been influenced by  Elias Häusser and Lauritz de Thurah.

Like Krieger, he participated strongly in creating fine bourgeois dwellings in Copenhagen, especially the gabled houses on Købmagergade.

His most notable achievements include the Headquarters of the Asiatic Company in Christianshavn (1739), the Masting Crane on Holmen (1750) and Stephen Hansen's Mansion in Helsingør (1763). He also adapted Glorup Manor on Funen to the Baroque style adding a magnificent mansard roof (1744).

For almost 30 years, de Lange was the leading master builder at the Holmen Naval Station. Among other things, he constructed 24 Nyboder two-storey houses from 1754 to 1756.

De Lange is remembered above all for his fine, simple buildings in the classical Rococo style. A good example is Damsholte Church on the island of Møn, the only Rococo village church in Denmark.

Personal life
De Lange married twice:  first with Jacomine Pieters in the Hague (1724), then with Anna Lucia Ehlers in Copenhagen (1738).

List of works
 Åbenrå 32, Copenhagen (1739s)
 Marskalsgården, Købmagergade, Copenhagen (1729-1732)
 Reformed Church's rectory, Åbenrå 32-34, Copenhagen (1730-32)
 Ziegler House, Nybrogade, Copenhagen (1732)
 Danish Asiatic Company, Asiatisk Plads, Christianshavn, Copenhagen (1738)
 Tugt- og børnehuset (1739-1741, demolished)
 Arsenalet, Holmen, Copenhagen (1741-1745 and 1745)
 Damsholte Church, Møn (1742-1743)
 Adaption of Glorup Manor, Funen (1743-1744)
 Nyholm Central Guardhouse, Golmen (1744-1745)
 Gunpowder magazine, Frederick's Bastion, Christianshavn (1745-1746m built from a design by Vauban)
 Skagen Lighthouse, Skagen (1747)
 Extension of Husby Church, Funen (1747-1748)
Ø Ved Stranden 16, Copenhagen (1748)
 Mastekranen, Holmen, Copenhagen (1749)
  Gammel Strand 48 (now Kunstforeningen, Copenhagen (1750–1751)
 Møllmanns Landsted, Allégade 6, Frederiksberg, Copenhagen (1750s)
 Nyboder (two-storey houses), Copenhagen (1758)
 Philip de Lange House, Prinsessegade 54, Christianshavn, Copenhagen (c. 1760) 
 Store Mariendal, Strandvejen, Hellerup (1759, demolished)
 Stephen Hansen Mansion, Helsingør (1759-1760
 Roysal Pawn, Gammel Strand, Copenhagen (1762)
 Hovedmagasinet and Takkelloftet, Holmen (1767-1772, design by Lange)
 Warehouse for Danish Asiatic Company, Asiatisk Plads, Christianshavn, Copenhagen (1781, design by Lange)

Gallery

See also

 Architecture of Denmark
 Wedell Mansion
 Philip Lange

References

Bibliography
Elling, Christian: Philip de Lange. En studie i dansk Barokarkitektur. Akademisk Arkitektforening, Copenhagen. 1931, 48 pp.
Rikke Tønnes: Stephen Hansens palæ - Bygherren - Arkitekten Philip de Lange - Livet i og omkring et helsingørsk handelshus, Copenhagen: Arkitektens Forlag, 1997, 228 pp.

1705 births
1766 deaths
18th-century Danish architects
Danish Baroque architects
Dutch Baroque architects
Rococo architects